Michael Kury (born 30 August 1978) is a retired Austrian ski jumper.

In the World Cup he finished thrice among the top 30, his best result being a 24th place from Garmisch-Partenkirchen in the Four Hills Tournament in January 1996.

He finished second overall in the 1995-1996 Continental Cup.

External links

1978 births
Living people
Austrian male ski jumpers